Fatjon Muhameti (born 18 October 1982, in Tiranë) is a former Albanian footballer who played for KF Tirana and KF Gramshi. He now works as an official matchday delegate for the Albanian Football Association.

References

1982 births
Living people
Footballers from Tirana
Albanian footballers
Kategoria Superiore players
Kategoria e Dytë players
Association football defenders
KF Tirana players
KF Gramshi players